Masagaway or Masagawayn Town is a small town in the central Galgaduud region of Somalia. It's 250km away from the capital Mogadishu.

References

Districts of Somalia